Leucyl/cystinyl aminopeptidase, also known as cystinyl aminopeptidase (CAP), insulin-regulated aminopeptidase (IRAP), human placental leucine aminopeptidase (PLAP), oxytocinase, and vasopressinase, is an enzyme of the aminopeptidase group that in humans is encoded by the LNPEP gene.

This gene encodes a zinc-dependent aminopeptidase (metalloexopeptidase) that cleaves vasopressin, oxytocin, lys-bradykinin, met-enkephalin, dynorphin A and other peptide hormones. The protein can be secreted in maternal serum, reside in intracellular vesicles with the insulin-responsive glucose transporter GLUT4, or form a type II integral membrane glycoprotein. The protein catalyzes the final step in the conversion of angiotensinogen to angiotensin IV (AT4) and is also a receptor for AT4. Alternative splicing results in multiple transcript variants encoding different isoforms.

Mutations in this gene have been associated to psoriasis risk.(doi:10.1038/jid.2013.317)

Interactions
Cystinyl aminopeptidase has been shown to interact with TNKS2.

References

Further reading

External links
 The MEROPS online database for peptidases and their inhibitors: M01.011
 

EC 3.4.11
Enzymes